Ratha and Thistle-Chaser is a young adult novel, third in the series The Books of the Named by Clare Bell. The series follows a group of sentient, prehistoric large cats called the Named, led by the female cat, Ratha. It also deals with their struggles against the group of non-sentient cats, the Unnamed. On October 18, 2007, it was reprinted by the company Penguin Group.

Ratha, who gave birth to five cubs in the first book, Ratha's Creature, had a non-sentient cub who she named Thistle-chaser with her UnNamed mate, Bonechewer. Ratha, in a fit of anger with Bonechewer, bit her daughter when she got in the way of her and Bonechewer's fight. This causes Thistle-chaser damage that, due to the lack of therapy, caused one of her legs to shrivel and becomes useless over time. Bonechewer is furious with her for harming their daughter and chases her away, which causes Ratha to reunite with her clan. After Bonechewer is killed in a raid, Ratha has no clue as to where her offspring went.

Plot
Thistle-chaser, the daughter of the Named clan leader, Ratha, has no recollection of her past or true name. Due to this, she lives alone on a coastline, befriending the seamares that reside there, and goes by 'Newt'. In her dreams, a creature she knows as the Dreambiter, which bites her foreleg, often makes her go into seizures and fits of panic. A clan cat, Thakur comes across Thistle-chaser while searching for water. He befriends her and starts having her swim in a lagoon which acts as therapy for her shriveled leg. When he reports of the water and seamares that live there, Ratha decides to move the clan and their livestock to the coast, going as far as to capture the seamares. Thistle-chaser is upset by this and frees them, making Ratha, who refuses to believe that Thistle-chaser is her daughter, order the clan to attack Thistle-chaser if she tries anything like it again.

Thistle-chaser eventually learns that Ratha is her mother and realizes that the Dreambiter would be destroyed if Ratha was killed. Ratha bit Thistle-chaser when she was young, which was the cause of the Dreambiter. Thistle-chaser decides to attack Ratha and the two get into a fight. When Ratha gets her foot stuck between two rocks, Mishanti, an Unnamed cub which Ratha was going to abandon, gets caught in the fray and tries to defend Ratha. In her fury, Thistle-chaser goes after him, only to be stopped by Ratha, who calls her names and brings her back to reality. Thakur and Fessran, another clan cat, arrive soon and together with Thistle-chaser bring Ratha and Mishanti to safety.

Through these events, Ratha is able to admit that Thistle-chaser is her daughter and Thistle-chaser is able to forgive her mother. Mishanti, being an orphan and lacking any proof that he is sentient, is taken in by Thistle-chaser who will raise him and bring out his hidden sentience.

Terms
The Named are a group of sentient Dinaelurus; they call themselves a clan and are led by the female Ratha. The clan herds creatures and uses them as livestock, and also have fire, which they call Red Tongue, which they use for heat and protection. They are recognizable by their cleanliness and their eyes, which have a distinct look of knowingness and brightness. They can love and feel for other members of the clan and have morals and their own language. The group has Herders, who keep herd the livestock and protect them, and Firekeepers, who tend to the Red Tongue.

The Unnamed are the opposite; non-sentient Dinaelurus who live in no distinct group, but band together sometimes for attacks. They are dirty and their eyes are distinct and unaware of what happens. They rely on instinct and have no language. A cat can be born Unnamed, but it is due to related lineage with members of the Named. Unlike the Named, they do not herd animals, but hunt instead. The Unnamed are Sabre Tooth Cats.

Red Tongue is fire used by The Named.

Seamare is the term used for water creatures with protruding teeth, a horse-like head and neck, and a blubbery body. They have webbed feet, and live in herds. The Seamare are desmostylians.

Media
Ratha and Thistle-chaser was originally released in 1990, a sequel to both Ratha's Creature and Clan Ground. Later, it was re-released by Puffin Books with new cover art, as the rest of the series was. While Ratha's Creature was made into an animated CBS movie, Ratha and Thistle-chaser, like its prequel and sequels, was never made into an animated or live-action format.

The Books of the Named

Prequels
Ratha's Creature
Clan Ground

Sequels
Ratha's Challenge
Ratha's Courage

References

1990 American novels
American young adult novels
Children's fantasy novels
Novels set in prehistory
Children's novels about animals
Margaret K. McElderry books